These are the books of the King James Version of the Bible along with the names and numbers given them in the Douay Rheims Bible and Latin Vulgate. This list is a complement to the list in Books of the Latin Vulgate. It is an aid to finding cross references between two longstanding standards of Biblical literature.

Preliminary note
There are 80 books in the King James Bible; 39 in the Old Testament, 14 in the Apocrypha, and 27 in the New Testament.

When citing the Latin Vulgate, chapter and verse are separated with a comma, for example "Ioannem 3,16"; in English bibles chapter and verse are separated with a colon, for example "John 3:16".

The Psalms of the two versions are numbered differently. The Vulgate follows the Septuagint numbering, while the King James Version follows the numbering of the Masoretic Text. This generally results in the Psalms of the former being one number behind the latter. See the article on Psalms for more details.

Old Testament

Apocrypha

New Testament

Notes 

King James
Books
King James Version